Candoni, officially the Municipality of Candoni , formerly known as Tabla Valley, is a 4th class municipality in the province of Negros Occidental, Philippines. According to the 2020 census, it has a population of 23,751 people.

In 2007, Candoni was the least populated municipality in Negros Occidental with 0.9% share in the total population of the province.

Etymology
Candoni was derived from the native phrase Kan Dune, which translates to "belonging to Dune", a legendary beautiful maiden named Dionesia who committed suicide after being forced by her parents to marry a man she did not love.

History
Formerly a barrio of the Municipality of Cauayan, Candoni started as the center of the Tabla Valley Settlement founded in 1935 by Santiago H. Diego, a prominent man from the Municipality of Isabela. He led a group of settlers with a pioneering spirit and prompted by the desire to have a piece of land they could call their own.  Pooling their resources and organizing themselves into a cooperative they called Tablenos, the settlers started clearing the valley starting from where the town is now located.  They toiled the forests enduring hardships, but many of them died of malaria.

Their efforts were noticed by the Provincial Government who supported them, starting with Gov. Emilio Gaston to Gov. Valenciano Gatuslao, who along with then Speaker Gil Montilla, helped them appeal to President Manuel Roxas in Malacanang for tangible government aid, which came in the form of the road from Dancalan, Ilog to Candoni, following the trail blazed by the Tablenos.

Candoni was finally declared a municipality on August 22, 1958, through Executive Order No. 314 signed by President Carlos P. Garcia.  It was inaugurated on August 12, 1961, with Benjamin R. Nava as its first acting mayor.

Recent history of Candoni again showed its people's struggle, this time, against the turmoils brought about by the insurgency problem. Fed up with being caught in the crossfire of battles between rebels and government forces, the people of Sitio Cantomanyog in Barangay Haba of the town declared their area as a "Zone of Peace", the first in the country ever to be declared as such by the residents composed of some 40 families, and this policy is respected by both rebels and government troops.

Geography
It is approximately four hour drive from Bacolod City aboard a public utility vehicle and about two hours and 45 minutes on a private car. From Bacolod City, buses are available at Bacolod South Terminal. From Kabankalan City, one can take the public utility jeepneys or buses going to this town. Candoni is the third town with highest elevation in Negros Occidental after Salvador Benedicto and San Carlos City.

Climate

Barangays
Candoni is politically subdivided into 9 barangays.

As of 2015, Candoni has a total population of 21,789 and its registered voting population (as of 2015) is 12,449.

Demographics

Economy

Candoni is a fourth class municipality. It is a hinterland town and heavily dependent on agriculture, its main products are sugarcane, rice, corn and coffee. Candoni posted more than 200% rice sufficiency for 2017 and 2018.

Financial 

Source: Commission on Audit of the Philippines

^ Among 1,489 municipalities in 2015 - 2016 and 1,488 in 2017 based on Net Assets.

^^ Among 19 municipalities based on Net Assets.

Tourism
Candoni have the following tourism sites:
 Sitio Cantomanyog Zone of Peace, Barangay Haba
 Hinarap Falls, Barangay Agboy
 Pineapple Farm, Barangay Gatuslao
 Twin Cave, Barangay West
 Kennington Hill Nature Park, Brgy West and Gatuslao
 Mount Tahutay, Barangay Caningay
 Shang Spring Resort, Barangay East
 Tigmaya-Paco Road

Zone of Peace 

The Sitio of Cantomanyog in Barangay Haba was the first Zone of Peace in the Philippines. Peace Zone culture is so influential that the people of Cantomanyog were able to produce cultural products therefrom like oral history of Cantomanyog, poetry and music to the extent that it inspired a cluster of communities to do same.

The first skirmish between the NPA and the military happened in Southern Negros in September 1971. With the information that the NPA had a base in the towns of Candoni and Kabankalan, the military immediately sent troops in the said area to hunt down the rebels. The NPA's popularity in the hinterlands of Southern Negros, where government was seldom seen and felt, could be explained by its ability to dispense swift, revolutionary justice and maintain order in the community. On April 18, 1989, an undetermined number of NPA guerillas launched a surprise attack on the 7th IB, Alpha Company Detachment at Caningay, Candoni. The Caningay raid was one of the NPA's most daring attacks on a military outpost in Candoni.

In 1989, on the island of Negros, because of the inhuman conditions in the evacuation centers, nearly 300 persons - most of them were children - died from malnutrition and measles as the result of the U.S.-organized bombing raid, "Operation Thunderbolt" in the municipalities of Candoni, Hino–baan, Ilog, Cauayan, Kabankalan and Sipalay popularly referred to as the CHICKS area. The people of Cantomanyog began to ask themselves, "Why is this war happening here?"

In November 1989, the Area Core Group leaders of the Gagmay'ng Kristiyanong Katilingban of Cantomanyog (GKK) or the Basic Ecclesial Community of Cantomanyog (BEC) after their usual panimbahon (community prayer meeting) discussed the peace zone concept. On December 4, 1989, the Basic Christian Community of Cantomanyog gathered for a General assembly wherein a Resolution to Establish the Zone of Peace was read, passed and approved. Their simple declaration was delivered to both the Armed Forces of the Philippines and the New People's Army. The NPA and the AFP respected the Zone of Peace.

On February 16, 1990, during a worship service and Eucharist, Natividad Epalan, a community leader holding her two-year-old child, read a statement declaring the village of Cantomanyog to be the first "zone of peace" in the Philippines.

"Our village is open to everyone whose intentions are good," she read. "We wish to be free of the danger of weapons of war and death…Therefore, whoever enters this zone of peace should not bring any guns with them."

On 25 May 1993, Senator Rodolfo G. Biazon sponsored a resolution passed by the Senate as Resolution No. 435 urging the Executive Department for the declaration of Cantomanyog and the other six Peace Zones as Special Development Areas. President Ramos, consequently and in cognizance to the Comprehensive Peace Policy, recognized the legitimacy of the said Peace Zones and further declared them as Special Development Areas (SDAs). Each of the seven SDAs was allocated P5,000,000.00 for community development projects through the then National Program for Unification and Development Council now part of the Office of the Presidential Adviser on the Peace Process under the Office of the President.

Sit-an Cave 

Sit-an Cave is a natural marvel that extends about one hundred fifty meters from its entrance to its hindmost part which resembles a church-like cavern with cool natural pool with overflowing water ranging from knee-high to waistline depth that forms an underground stream running along the columns of stalactites that hung like a pendant from its roof.

Festivals

The Dinagyaw sa Tablas Festival is the annual town fiesta happen every February 7–11 and it is also called Feast of Our Lady of Lourdes. The Dinagyaw sa Tablas Festival aims to project and manifest the spirit of cooperation exerted by the Tablenos when they trail blazed the wilderness of the Tabla Velley and established the Tabla Valley settlement that became the predecessor of Candoni.

Dinagyaw came from the word dagyaw a Hiligaynon term which means a group of people helping each other to perform a specific task.

Aside from the annual town fiesta, Candonians also enjoy from multiple Barangay and community fiestas whole year-round.

Education
Candoni has only one school district, District of Candoni. There are 18 public elementary schools, 3 public secondary schools and 1 private secondary school. During the school year 2015–2016, there are 4,335 elementary pupils, 1,271 public high school students and more or less 500 private high school students.

Elementary

High school

There are also two (2) Annex High School Campuses, the Gatuslao Campus under Quirico G. Manzano Memorial NHS and the Payauan Campus under Caningay NHS.

Tertiary 

The Municipal Government of Candoni and Negros Occidental State College of Agriculture (NESCA), now Central Philippines State University (CPSU) entered into a Memorandum of Agreement to install a tertiary school campus. The Central Philippine State University, Candoni Campus currently offers four (4) 4-year course Programs such as Bachelor in Animal Science, Bachelor in Elementary Education, Bachelor in Secondary Education, Bachelor of Science in Agriculture.

Notable personalities

Leopoldo Serantes – competed at the 1988 Seoul Olympics in the Light Flyweight (-48 kg) division winning the bronze medal
Romel Oliveros – a super flyweight national boxer
Elisheba Etabag Manzano – 2007 Gold Medal (Top 1) – Highest Achievement Award for Certified Internal Auditor exam.
Mary Grace Baloyo – was a First lieutenant in the Philippine Air Force who posthumously received the Philippines' highest military award for courage - the Medal of Valor

References

External links

 [ Philippine Standard Geographic Code]
Philippine Census Information
Local Governance Performance Management System

Municipalities of Negros Occidental
Establishments by Philippine executive order